Hry a sny is a 1958 Czechoslovak film starring Josef Kemr.

References

External links
 

1958 films
Czechoslovak fantasy films
1950s Czech-language films
Czech anthology films
1950s Czech films
Czech fantasy films